{{DISPLAYTITLE:C10H21N}}
The molecular formula C10H21N (molar mass: 155.28 g/mol, exact mass: 155.1674 u) may refer to:

 Levopropylhexedrine (Eventin)
 Pempidine
 Propylhexedrine (Benzedrex)